Shirley Thompson may refer to:

Shirley Thomson, Canadian civil servant
Shirley Thompson (composer), English composer of Jamaican descent